Nanjil Nadan is the pseudonym of G. Subramaniam (born 31 December 1947), a Sahitya academy winning Tamil writer from Tamil Nadu, India.

Biography
Nanjil Nadan was born in Veera Narayanamangalam, Thazhakudy in Kanyakumari District to Ganapathiya Pillai and Saraswathi Ammal. Born G. Subramaniam, he uses the pseudonym Nanjil Nadan (means a native of the Nanjil Nadu – the area comprising the taluks of Agastheeswaram and Thovalai in Kanyakumari district ). He has a M.Sc degree in Mathematics. He works at W. H. Brady and Co in Coimbatore. He began his literary career by working for Bombay Tamil Sangam's literary magazine Aedu. His first short story, "Viradham", was published in July 1975 in the magazine Deepam, run by Na. Parthasarathy. In 2002, his novel Thalaikeezh Vigithangal was made into a Tamil film titled Solla Marandha Kadhai by Thangar Bachan. In 2010 he was awarded the Sahitya Akademi Award for Tamil for his short story collection Soodiya poo soodarka. His novel Ettu Thikkum Madha Yaanai is being made into a Tamil film titled Padithurai. He has authored six novels, 112 short stories, two short story anthologies, five essay collections, and two poetry collections. Some of his works have been translated to English, Malayalam, and French and included as part of the curriculum in several educational institutions.

Nanjil Nadan is now penning a book on his community, the Vellalas of Nanjilnadu.

He is married to Santhiya. They have one son and one daughter. His daughter Sangeetha is a medical doctor, and his son Ganesh is an engineer.

Awards and recognitions
Tamil Literary Garden has announced that Nanjil Nadan has won the Iyal Award, their Lifetime Achievement Award for 2012. He received the award formally in June 2013
He won the Sahitya Akademi award in 2010 in Tamil language category for his collection of short stories Soodiya poo soodarka.
Received the Non-Fiction award from The Tamil Literary Garden, Canada for the book 'Nathiyin Pizhaiyandru Narumpunal Inmai'
Ilakkiya Sinthanai Award (for Viradham)
Govt of Tamil Nadu literary award for best novel (for Sathuranga Kudhirai)
Kasthuri Seenivasan Trust Award
Thirupur Tamil Sangam award
Kannadasan Award
Lily Devasigamani Award

Bibliography

Novels
Thalaikeezh vigithangal
Mamisapadaippu
Enbiladanai veyilkayum
Midhavai
Ettuthikkum madhayaanai
Sadhuranga Kuthirai

Short stories
"Koambai" (கோம்பை)
"Deivangal Onaigal Aadugal (தெய்வங்கள் ஓநாய்கள் ஆடுகள்)"
"Vakkuporukkigal (வாக்குப் பொறுக்கிகள்)"
"Uppu"
"Peikkottu"
"Prandhu"
"Khan Sahib"
"Soodiya Poo Soodarka"
"Kongu Ther Vazhkkai"
"Tholkudi"
"Val Virunthu (Kumbamuni Sirukathaigal)"

Poetry
Manullipambu
Pachai Nayagi
Vazhukkupparai

Non-fiction
Nanjil Nattu Vellalar Vazhkai
Theedhum Nandrum
Nanjendrum Amudhendrum Ondru
Thigambaram
Kavalan kaavaan Yenin
Panuval Potradhum
Nathiyin Pizhayandru Narumpunal Inmai
Ambaraathooni
Sitrilakkiyangal
Eppadi Paaduveno ?
Ahan Surukel (Selected Articles) 
Kai Mann Alavu (Kunkumam Weekly Articles)

See also
 List of Indian writers

References

https://nanjilnadan.com/%E0%AE%A8%E0%AE%BE%E0%AE%9E%E0%AF%8D%E0%AE%9A%E0%AE%BF%E0%AE%B2%E0%AF%8D%E0%AE%A8%E0%AE%BE%E0%AE%9F%E0%AE%A9%E0%AF%8D1/

External links
Official blog
Profile in Tamilauthors.com
Nanjil Nadan on his first novel (January 2010, Puthagam pesugirathu – In Tamil)
 Article in TamilAuthors.com
 Article in The Hindu

People from Kanyakumari district
1947 births
Living people
Writers from Tamil Nadu
Recipients of the Sahitya Akademi Award in Tamil
Tamil writers
Indian Tamil people
20th-century Indian poets
20th-century Indian short story writers
20th-century Indian novelists